Hyperstrotia secta, the black-patched graylet moth, is a moth of the family Erebidae. The species was first described by Augustus Radcliffe Grote in 1879. It is found in North America, where it has been recorded from Alabama, Arkansas, Florida, Georgia, Illinois, Indiana, Kentucky, Louisiana, Maryland, Massachusetts, Mississippi, New Hampshire, New Jersey, New York, North Carolina, Ohio, Oklahoma, South Carolina, Tennessee, Virginia and West Virginia.

The wingspan is about 17 mm. Adults have been recorded on wing from April to September.

References

Boletobiinae
Moths described in 1879